Seks, droga, nasilje i strah / Balkan Horor Rock is a compilation by the Serbian rock band Električni Orgazam. The compilation, featuring new studio material on the A-side and live material on the B-side, was recorded at the Novi Sad Studio M. The material, together with the follow-up, the live album Balkan Horor Rok II, was rereleased on one CD by Yellow Dog Records.

Track listing 
All tracks by S. Gojković except where noted.

Seks, droga, nasilje i strah 
 "Mentalno" (3:38)
 "Sad ti je teško" (2:30)
 "Mala lopta metalna (G. Čavajda, S. Gojković)(4:45)
 "Ja mogu još" (2:46)
 "Seks, droga, nasilje i strah" (5:14)

Balkan Horror Rock 
 "Vudu bluz" (3:15)
 "Krokodili dolaze (5:10)
 "Afrika" (2:05)
 "Vi" (S. Vukićević, S. Gojković) (2:20)
 "Ša la la" (5:03)
 "Zlatni papagaj" (2:00)

Personnel 
 Srđan Gojković Gile (guitar, vocals)
 Branislav Petrović Banana (guitar, vocals)
 Goran Čavajda Čavke (drums)
 Zoran Radomirović Švaba (bass)

References 
 Discography page at the official site
 Seks, droga, nasilje i strah / Balkan Horor Rock at Discogs

1992 compilation albums
PGP-RTB compilation albums
Električni Orgazam compilation albums